Love for Lydia is a British television serial made by London Weekend Television and broadcast from 9 September to 2 December 1977 on ITV. It is based on the novel by H. E. Bates, first published in 1952. The series was written by Julian Bond. This period serial stars Mel Martin in the title role of Lydia Aspen. The series has a total of 13 episodes. It is available on DVD in both the UK and North American markets,.

Premise
In his teen years, Edward Richardson meets the soon-to-be wealthy Lydia Aspen. She has been brought to live with her aunts and uncle in Evensford after the death of her father. The two begin a romance that swings between love and disillusion, chiefly brought on by their immaturity. The story spans the pre-depression era and after with both tragedy and self-realization.

Cast
Mel Martin as Lydia Aspen
Christopher Blake as Edward Richardson 
Sherrie Hewson as Nancy Holland
Peter Davison as Tom Holland
Jeremy Irons as Alex Sanderson
Beatrix Lehmann as Bertie Aspen
Rachel Kempson as Juliana Aspen
Michael Aldridge as Captain Rollo Aspen
Ralph Arliss as Blackie Johnson
Christopher Hancock as Mr Richardson
David Ryall as Bretherton
Wendy Gifford as Mrs Sanderson

Episodes

Reception
In a contemporary review, John J. O'Connor of The New York Times found two weaknesses with the series; it was "too long" for the source material and he thought the characters too stereotypical. O’Connor thought highly of the cast and although there were flaws he wrote "this is a production obviously involving uncommon intelligence. Extraordinary care has been taken on all levels." He summarized: "It often demands patience, but attention will be rewarded with touches of rare insight."

References

External links

 Nostalgia Central

Period television series
1977 British television series debuts
1977 British television series endings
1970s British drama television series
London Weekend Television shows